Ravshan  (Russian and Tajik: Равшан) is a jamoat in north-western Tajikistan. It is located in Zafarobod District in Sughd Region. The jamoat has a total population of 16,363 (2015).

Notes

References

Populated places in Sughd Region
Jamoats of Tajikistan